Amur and Timur are respectively a tiger and a goat who established an unlikely friendship in a safari park in Primorye in the Far East of Russia. Timur was placed in Amur's enclosure as food but, by his confident behaviour, established a rapport with Amur, who did not eat him. The pair were separated after another fight in 2016 and Timur was moved to the Exhibition of Achievements of National Economy (VDNKh) in Moscow. Timur died on November 5, 2019, aged 5.

References

External links
 
  

Duos
Individual animals in Russia
Primorsky Krai
2012 animal births
2014 animal births